Pauline de Witt (née Guizot; 22 June 1831 in Paris – 28 February 1874 in Cannes) was a French historian and translator.

Biography 
She was the second daughter of François Guizot and the sister of Guillaume and Henriette Guizot.

She wrote Histoire de Guillaume le Conquérant ("History of William the Conqueror") and actively collaborated to her father's last work Histoire de France racontée à mes petits-enfants ("History of France told to my grand-children").

On May 18, 1850, she married historian and Calvados deputy , with whom she had seven children. Their two daughters Henriette and Pauline married the brothers Conrad and Cornélis Henri de Witt, who were also Protestants.

Pauline de Witte was buried at the cemetery of Saint-Ouen-le-Pin, Calvados.

Works 
 Guillaume le Conquérant, ou, L'Angleterre sous les Normands, London: Hachette; Philadelphia: J.B. Lippincott, 1878.
 Six mois de guerre, 1870-1871 : lettres et journal de Mme Cornélis de Witt, 1894.
 Histoire de deux petits frères, Paris: Hachette, 1890.
 Contes anglais, Paris, 1883.
Translation
 Elizabeth Prentiss, Les petits brins de fil ou fil embrouillé, fil-d'argent et fil-d’or, transl. from English by Pauline de Cornelis de Witt, 1865.

References

Bibliography 
 

19th-century French women writers
19th-century French historians
19th-century French translators
French women historians
English–French translators
French Protestants
1831 births
Writers from Paris
1874 deaths
19th-century deaths from tuberculosis
Tuberculosis deaths in France